Kajuluru is a village and a Mandal in Kakinada district in the state of Andhra Pradesh in India.

Geography

References 

Villages in Kajuluru mandal